Rouveen is a village in the Dutch province of Overijssel. It is located in the municipality of Staphorst, about 4 km southwest of that town.

Rouveen and its church featured in documentaries about its resident feminist Hilligje Kok-Bisschop.

Gallery

References

Populated places in Overijssel
Staphorst